Kohāṭī is a Hindko dialect of Kohat District, Khyber Pakhtunkhwa, north-western Pakistan. It is spoken in the city of Kohat as well as in a string of villages running east along the road to Kushalgarh on the Indus. The dominant language of this area is Pashto, to which Kohati has been losing ground at least since Partition. Kohati is closely related to the Hindko dialects to the east: Awankari, Chacchi and Ghebi.

It has borrowed words from Pashto to a higher extent than other Hindko dialects. A lexical similarity study based on a 210-item wordlist found out that it shares 79% of its vocabulary with the Hindko dialect spoken to the east in the city of Attock, and 76% each with the dialects further east in Talagang Tehsil and Haripur District, as well as the rural dialect spoken immediately north in Peshawar District.

Phonology 

The plosive consonants of Kohati can take four phonation types: voiceless, aspirated, voiced, and voiced aspirated (.

Kohati has a single tone: the high-falling (indicated here using a circumflex accent over the vowel). Voiced aspiration, however, was preserved before a stressed vowel:  'brother'.
Kohati shares with other Hindko varieties a historical "spontaneous" aspiration:  'one', as well as the preservation of the consonant cluster  at the start of a word:  'three'.

There are two phonological characteristics which distinguish Kohati from other Hindko varieties. One is the regular loss of nasalisation in rounded vowels at the end of a word (tũ > tu 'you'). The other one is the peculiar realisation of historical -dʒ- as -i-, almost -yy-, in the word ʌi 'today' and in forms of the verb 'to go', for example vʌ̃ie 'let him go' (in contrast respectively to ʌdʒ and vʌɳdʒe in the rest of Hindko).

Grammar 
Kohati has a peculiar distribution of the dative-accusative postposition. As in other Indo-Aryan languages, the form of the noun used before postpositions is the oblique: pʊttʊr 'son' for example has the oblique form pʊtre. To this form Kohati appends the postposition ã to form the dative-accusative: pʊtre ã '(to) the son', which is the pattern found in the rest of Hindko (in contrast to Punjabi where the postpostion is nũ or Saraiki, where it is kũ). But because the oblique form in the plural is also -ã, Kohati avoids the succession of identical vowels by switching to ko in the plural: thus pʊtrã ko '(to) the sons'.

References

Bibliography 
 

 A grammar sketch is found on pages 486–96.

Punjabi dialects
Languages of Khyber Pakhtunkhwa
Kohat District